Wedding dress of Princess Alice may refer to:

 Wedding dress of Princess Alice of the United Kingdom
 Wedding dress of Lady Alice Montagu Douglas Scott, later known as Princess Alice, Duchess of Gloucester